The Alpine City Hall, located at North Main Street in Alpine, Utah, United States, was built in 1936.

Description
The structure includes elements of Classical Revival and Colonial Revival architecture. It was listed on the National Register of Historic Places in 1991.

It is one of 40 buildings in Utah County that was constructed with Works Project Administration depression-era funding. It is also one of few buildings in Alpine having period revival architecture.

See also

 National Register of Historic Places listings in Utah County, Utah

References

External links

Colonial Revival architecture in Utah
Neoclassical architecture in Utah
Government buildings completed in 1936
Alpine, Utah
Buildings and structures in Utah County, Utah
City and town halls on the National Register of Historic Places in Utah
National Register of Historic Places in Utah County, Utah
City and town halls in Utah